Neckbeard or neck beard may refer to:

 Neckbeard, a facial hairstyle that mostly covers the neck, as opposed to other parts of the face 
 Neckbeard (slang), a pejorative term for men, based on a stereotype of young men with poor facial grooming